Bayerisch may refer to the following places in Bavaria, Germany:

Bayerisch Eisenstein, municipality in the Regen district
Bayerisch Gmain, municipality in the district of Berchtesgadener Land